Gordon Arthur may refer to:

 Gordon Arthur (footballer) (born 1958), Scottish former footballer
 Gordon Arthur (bishop) (1909–1992), Anglican bishop in Australia

See also
Arthur Gordon (disambiguation)